Chú Tễu (literally uncle comedian, buffoon, joker) is a typical puppet in Vietnamese water puppetry. Tễu is bigger than other puppets.  This character usually introduces the performance and makes humorous actions for the audience.

References

Puppets
Vietnamese culture